Medieval Cholas are a part of Chola Dynasty and rose to prominence during the middle of the 9th century CE and established one of the greatest empires of South India. They successfully united South India under their rule and through their naval strength extended their influence in Southeast Asia and Sri Lanka. They had trade contacts with the Arabs in the west and with the Chinese in the east.

Medieval Cholas and Chalukyas were continuously in conflict over the control of Vengi and the conflict eventually exhausted both the empires and led to their decline. The Chola dynasty merged into the Eastern Chalukyan dynasty of Vengi through decades of alliances and later united under the Later Cholas.

Early history
Vijayalaya Chola was probably a Pallava vassal. Vijayalaya captured Thanjavur in 848, making use of the opportunity during a war between Pandyas and Pallavas. The Cholas under Aditya I captured the Pallavas in the north (c. 869) and subdued the Pandayas and Cheras in the south (c. 903). Parantaka I drove the Pandayas out of their territories and captured Sri Lanka in 910. Rashtrakutas and Gangas in the north posed the biggest threat to the nascent Chola Empire and the Chola prince Rajaditya was killed in the battle of Thakkolam in 949. Parantaka had a long reign, and when he died in 950 his second son Gandaraditya became king. The Chola throne went to Gandaraditya's younger brother Arinjaya briefly before Arinjaya's son Sundara Chola took the reins of the kingdom overlooking the claims of Uttama Chola, son of Gandaraditya.

The Chola power recovered during Sundara Chola's reign. The Chola army under the command of the crown prince Aaditha Karikala defeated the Pandyas and invaded up to Tondaimandalam in the north. Aaditha Karikala was assassinated in a political plot suspected to be enacted by Uttama Chola. Uttama forced Sundara Chola to declare him as heir apparent and took over the reins in 970.

Golden Era
Raja Raja, the son of Sundara Chola, succeeded Uttama in 985. During the reign of Raja Raja and his son Rajendra Chola, the Chola influence spread across South East Asia. Rajaraja consolidated the Chola defences in the north by eliminating the last remnants of the Rashtrakutas. The Rashtrakutas were replaced by the Chalukyas, who were in constant conflict with the Cholas. Rajaraja soon extended his kingdom overseas to Lanka and the Chola army occupied northern portion of the island in 993. Rajaraja also invaded Vengi to restore the throne to his nephew Saktivarman. Rajendra Chola extended the empire by completing the conquest of Sri Lanka in 1018.

Rajendra marched up to the river Ganges in 1019, defeating the Pala king Mahipala. Rajendra also fought the Western Chalukyas in 1021 and invaded Vengi to sustain the Chola influence in 1031. The Chola navy attacked and conquered the kingdom of Srivijaya to secure Chola strategic interests. There was no permanent territorial gain and the kingdom was returned to the Srivijaya king for recognition of Chola superiority and the payment of periodic tributes.

Chola Chalukya Wars
The history of Cholas from the period of Rajaraja was tinged with a series of conflicts with the Western Chalukyas. The Old Chalukya dynasty had split into two sibling dynasties of the Western and Eastern Chalukyas. Rajaraja's daughter Kundavai was married to the Eastern Chalukya prince Vimaladitya, who ruled from Vengi. Western Chalukyas felt that the Vengi kingdom was under their natural sphere of influence. Cholas inflicted several defeats on the Western Chalukyas. For the most part, the frontier remained at the Tungabhadra River for both kingdoms and resulted in the death of king Rajadhiraja Chola.

Decline and fall
Rajendra's reign was followed by three of his sons in succession: Rajadhiraja Chola I, Rajendra Chola II and Virarajendra Chola.  After Rajadhiraja died in 1054, Rajendra Chola II crowned himself on the battlefield.  Later, Virarajendra succeeded in 1063 and managed to split the Western Chalukya kingdom by convincing Vikramaditya IV to an alliance. When Virarajendra died, Vikramaditya VI tried to prevent Rajendra Chalukya, an Eastern Chalukyan prince of Chola descent, from ascending the throne of Vengi. According to the Kalingathuparani when the king, that is Virarajendra died, the empire was thrown into a disarray and chaos prevailed until Anabhaya (Kulottunga I) returned home from his northern campaign and restored order. Thus began the period of Later Cholas.

Society and culture
The medieval Cholas under Rajaraja and his successors developed a highly organized administrative structure with central control and autonomous village assemblies. The system of government was a hereditary monarchy and the coronation of the king was an impressive ceremony. The royal household had numerous servants of varied descriptions.  For the purpose of administration the empire was divided into convenient areas such as valanadu, mandalam, nadu, etc. Land revenue was the mainstay of public finance and great care was undertaken to recording land rights and revenue dues. Justice was administered by regularly constituted royal courts in addition to village courts. Crimes of the state, such as treason, were dealt with by the king himself. The most striking feature of the Chola period was the unusual vigour and efficiency of the autonomous rural institutions.

This period of the Chola rule saw the maturity of the Tamil Temple architecture. Rajaraja built the great Brihadisvara Temple in Thanjavur. His son Rajendra imitated this effort by building the temple at his new capital Gangaikonda Cholapuram. This age also saw the Hindu religious revival in both Saiva and Vaishnava traditions. The Saiva and Vishnava canons were collected and categorized during this period.

Notes

References 
 Nilakanta Sastri, K.A. (1955). A History of South India, OUP, New Delhi (Reprinted 2002).

Dynasties of India
Chola dynasty
Medieval India
History of Tiruchirappalli